Spartacus was the Thracian who led a slave uprising against Roman slavery.

Spartacus may also refer to:

Media

Film and television

 Spartacus (film), a 1960 film directed by Stanley Kubrick, starring Kirk Douglas, Laurence Olivier and Peter Ustinov 
 Spartakus and the Sun Beneath the Sea, a 1985 French animated television series, originally entitled Les Mondes Engloutis
 Spartacus (TV miniseries), a 2004 made-for-TV miniseries broadcast over two nights
 Spartacus (2010 TV series), a Starz original television series
 Spartacus: Blood and Sand, the first season of the series to be broadcast
 Spartacus: Gods of the Arena, a series that serves as a prequel to Blood and Sand
 Spartacus: Vengeance, the second season, serving as a sequel to Blood and Sand
 Spartacus: War of the Damned, the third season, serving as a sequel to Vengeance
 Sins of Rome, a 1953 film also known as Spartacus and Spartacus the Gladiator

Literature
 Spartacus (Fast novel), a historical novel by Howard Fast, the basis for Kubrick's film
 Spartacus (Gibbon novel), a historical novel by Lewis Grassic Gibbon
 Spartacus (1961 book), a political history by F.A. Ridley
 Spartacus, a fictional supercomputer in the James P. Hogan novel The Two Faces of Tomorrow
 Spartacus Educational, a book publisher and free online encyclopedia

Music and ballet
 Spartacus (Triumvirat album), by Triumvirat
 Spartacus (The Farm album), by The Farm
 Jeff Wayne's Musical Version of Spartacus
 Spartacus (ballet) or Spartak, ballet music by Aram Khachaturian

Publications
 Spartacus, a defunct newspaper by the Dutch resistance Marx–Lenin–Luxemburg Front
Spartacus, the magazine of the Greek section of the reunified Fourth International organization of Communist Internationalists Organization of Communist Internationalists of Greece-Spartacus
 Spartacus International Gay Guide, an annual publication

Sports
 Spartacus Rugby Club, a rugby club in Gothenburg, Sweden
 Fabian Cancellara (b. 1981), a Swiss cyclist by nickname

Other
 Spartacus League, the 1918 German revolutionary movement from which the Communist Party of Germany emerged
 Twentieth Anniversary Macintosh, a Macintosh computer by its development codename
 Spartacus Trial, a series of criminal trials against Camorra
 Spartacus Books, a non-profit, volunteer and collectively run bookstore and resource centre in Vancouver, British Columbia, Canada
 Spartacus (ship), a dredger built in 2018
 Spartacus (horse)
 Spartacus (bug), a genus of true bugs in the family Miridae

See also
 Spartak (disambiguation), the name of numerous sports clubs and teams in the former Soviet Union and other East European countries
 Spartakiad, athletic competitions held in the Soviet Union
 Adam Weishaupt (Brother Spartacus) (1748-1830), the code name of Adam Weishaupt, founder of the Order of Illuminati
 Spartocids, the name of several kings of the Bosporan Kingdom Cimmerian Bosporus
 Sportacus, a fictional character from the children's television show LazyTown
 Sparta (disambiguation)